The Queen of the Land Festival is an annual festival in County Offaly, Ireland, hosted by Offaly Macra na Feirme in which young women compete for the title "Queen of the Land" based on their "appearance, personality, energy, confidence, dress sense, rural knowledge and elocution".

The festival, which is currently sponsored by WR Shaw, was initiated by the Irish Farmers Journal in 1964 as part of the Kilkenny beer festival. The competition was then taken over by Offaly Macra three years later. 

County Meath lives up to the claim of being the "Royal County" by having had six Queens crowned over the years. Laois and Kilkenny come second with four titles each.

The only year the contest had to be postponed was 2001; this was owing to the foot-and-mouth disease crisis that hit Ireland that year. It had the effect of giving Anita Meagher the distinction of being the only Queen to rule for two years.

The host county has only tasted victory twice in the competition; Michelle Cody won in 1994 and Sinead Mulcahy in 2009, both from the Shinrone Macra Club.

2005 was the 40th anniversary of the festival. As part of the big celebrations, all former Queens were invited back to Tullamore to join in the festivities for the weekend. The festival is celebrating 54 years in 2017.

Previous winners

1960s winners
1964 – Phyllis Finnegan (née Ward) – County Meath
1965 – Marie Grey (née Curtis) – County Meath
1966 – Joan Caulfield – County Roscommon
1967 – Breda Keneavy – County Westmeath
1968 – Ann Kelly (née Minahan) – County Clare
1969 – Elleen Cloney – County Wexford

1970s winners
1970 – Jennifer McKenna (née Redpath) – County Meath
1971 – Moira Miller (née Hardgrove) – County Laois
1972 – Shelia Motherway (née Hallahan) – County Waterford
1973 – Elizabeth Sharkey (née Kelly) – County Wicklow
1974 – Joan O’Keeffe (née Bergin) – County Kilkenny
1975 – Mary O’Connor – County Cork
1976 – Philomena Byrne (née Collins) – County Meath
1977 – Mary Monaghan (née Harte) – County Kildare
1978 – Rosaleen Gallagher (née Gilsenan) – County Meath
1979 – Catherine Gorman (née Coffey) – County Kilkenny

1980s winners

1980 – Aine Kent – County Wicklow
1981 – Ornagh Darcy (née O’Mahoney) – County Wexford
1982 – Ann Dempsey (née Ryan) – County Wicklow
1983 – Ann Kavanagh (née Alrey) – County Waterford
1984 – Kathleen Murphy (née Sinnott) – County Laois
1985 – Helena Connolly (née McElvaney) – County Monaghan
1986 – Margaret McPaddan (née Quinn) – County Donegal
1987 – Eillsh Rahill (née Kirk) – County Louth
1988 – Clare Dillon – County Galway
1989 – Ann Marie McHugh – County Kildare

1990s winners
1990 – Chris Clifford – County Limerick
1991 – Alice Lynch – County Sligo
1992 – Marie Vines – County Cork
1993 – Michelle Sheerin – County Sligo
1994 – Michelle Cody – County Offaly
1995 – Josephine Rodgers – County Roscommon
1996 – Audrey Salley – County Kildare
1997 – Caroline Glancy – County Roscommon
1998 – Lorraine Morrissey – County Tipperary
1999 – Mairead McEvoy – County Kilkenny

2000s winners
2000 – Anita Meagher – County Waterford
2002 – Eimear O’Brien – County Wicklow
2003 – Caroline Tuite – County Meath
2004 – Catherine McCollum – County Cavan
2005 – Elaine Murphy – County Kilkenny
2006 – Breda Goulding – County Laois
2007 – Yvonne Daly – County Cork
2008 – Kate Harrison – County Dublin
2009 – Sinead Mulcahy – County Offaly

2010s winners
2010 – Sherine Prendergast – County Tipperary, South
2011 – Bernie Woods – County Kilkenny
2012 – Teresa Brennan – County Laois
2013 – Geraldine Barrett – Carbury Region, County Cork
2015 - Christine Buckley - County Kerry
2014 – Orla Murphy – County Galway
2017 - Emma Birchall - County Kildare
2018 – Louise Crowley – County Limerick

References

External links
Official site

Festivals in Ireland
Beauty pageants in Ireland
Tourist attractions in County Offaly